Jesse Glenn Landrum (July 31, 1912 – June 27, 1983) was an American professional baseball player who later became a longtime scout. He appeared in Major League Baseball as a second baseman in four games for the Chicago White Sox during the early weeks of the  season, but played in 1,521 games in the minor leagues between 1937 and 1953. 

He attended Texas A&M University and began his professional baseball career at age 24. In his brief MLB trial, Landrum was hitless in six at bats with one run batted in, and played errorless ball in field the field over 11 innings.

Landrum became a player-manager in the minors during the late 1940s, and then forged a long career as a scout for three major-league organizations. He died at age 70 in Beaumont, Texas, in 1983.

References

External links

1912 births
1983 deaths
Amarillo Gold Sox players
Baseball players from Texas
Beaumont Roughnecks players
Brownsville Charros players
Chicago White Sox players
Dallas Rebels players
Detroit Tigers scouts
Gainesville Owls players
Kansas City Blues (baseball) players
Longview Texans players
Major League Baseball second basemen
Memphis Chickasaws players
Minor league baseball managers
New York Yankees scouts
People from Crockett, Texas
Philadelphia Phillies scouts
Port Arthur Sea Hawks players
Sacramento Solons players
St. Paul Saints (AA) players
Shreveport Sports players
Texarkana Twins players
Texas A&M Aggies baseball players
Toledo Mud Hens players
Tyler Trojans players